Ege is a unisex given name of Turkish origin. Notable people with the name are as follows:

First name

Male
 Ege Arar (born 1996), Turkish basketball player
 Ege Aydan (born 1958), Turkish actor
 Ege Bagatur (1937–1990), Turkish politician
 Ege Çubukçu (born 1983), Turkish rapper and songwriter
 Ege Özkayımoğlu (born 2001), Turkish football player

Female
 Ege Kökenli (born 1993), Turkish actress

Middle name
 İsmail Ege Şaşmaz (born 1993), Turkish actor

Turkish unisex given names